H. George Decancq (died March 6, 1990) was an American engineer. He was known for his work of the  Verrazzano-Narrows suspension bridge. He was an engineer at the civil engineering firm Ammann & Whitney. Decancq worked for the Port of New York Authority from 1928 to 1959, on either side of service in the Navy in World War II. He was awarded the Authority’s Distinguished Service Medal in 1964. He died in March 1990 of Parkinson's disease at his home in Rochester, New York, at the age of 88.

References 

Place of birth missing
Year of birth missing
1990 deaths
Deaths from Parkinson's disease
American bridge engineers
American civil engineers
20th-century American engineers